The Royal Danish Agricultural Society (Danish: Det Kongelige Danske Landhusholdningsselskab, DKHL) was founded in 1769.

History
The Royal Danish Agricultural Society was established on 29 January  1769 at the initiative of J. H.E. Bernstorff's protegé Martin Hübner (1723–95).

The inspiration came from similar societies in other European countries, including Society for the Encouragement of Arts, Manufactures and Commerce in England (1753), Société Royale d'Agriculture de la Généralité de Tours (1760) and Société Royale d'Agriculture de la Généralité de Paris (1761) in France, Fürstlich-Anhaltische Deutsche Gesellschaft (1761) in Preussen, [[Imperial Free Economic Society for the Encouragement in Russia of Agriculture and House-Building}} in Russia (1765) and [[Academy of Agriculture, Commerce and Arts of Verona}} in Italy (1879). The goal of the new society was to promote the interest in agriculture thrlough through competitions (practical and theoretical) for farmers, craftsmen, artists, and theorists. The members were mainly farmers, clergy and estate owners. The president was usually a high-ranking civil servant. Its first president was Friedrich Ludwig von Moltke.

Awards
The Royal Danish Agricultural Society's medal was designed by the medallist Daniel Adzer.

Publications
Yje journal Tidsskrift for Landøkonomi has been published since 1831.

Presidents

Selskabet har én præsident. Tidligere blev selskabet ledet af tre præsidenter.

 1769–1774: Ludvig Moltke
 1769–1772: Johann Hartwig Ernst von Bernstorff
 1773–1783: Thomas Bugge
 1774–1778: Peter Christian Abildgaard
 1774–1787: Henrik Gerner
 1778–1781: Benjamin Georg Sporon
 1779–1786: Joachim Michael Geuss
 1782–1787: Vilhelm August Hansen
 1784–1798: Ove Malling
 1795–1797: Philip Rosenstand-Goiske
 1798–1801: Ernst Frederik von Walterstorff
 1803–1806: Christen Henriksen Pram
 1807–1808: Philip Rosenstand-Goiske (again)
 1809–1855: Jonas Collin
 1817–1855: Anders Sandøe Ørsted
 1819–1830: Johan Christian Drewsen
 1831–1839: V.F. Johnsen
 1840–1848: Iver Johan Unsgaa
 1850–1855: Frederik Treschow
 1855–1883: B.S. Jørgensen
 1860–1888: Edward Tesdorpf
 1866–1881: Ludvig Holstein-Holsteinborg
 1881–1893: Christian Danneskiold-Samsøe
 1883–1891: Niels Johannes Fjord
 1888–1897: Carl Castenschiold
 1889–1909: Knud Sehested
 1891–1898: J.C. la Cour
 1893–1894: Christian Lüttichau
 1898–1900: Frederik Friis
 1900–1902: Thomas Riise Segelcke
 1902–1910: Frederik Friis (igen)
 1909–1919: Carl Bech
 1910–1920: Theodor Westermann
 1911–1930: Frederik Christian Moltke
 1919–1934: Christian Sonne
 1934–1943: Karl Hasselbalch
 1934–1955: O.H. Larsen
 1941–1957: Axel Pedersen
 1943–1952: August Bech
 1956–1980: Edward Tesdorpf (den yngre)
 1963–1976: Aksel Olufsen
 1979–1994: Peter Skak Olufsen
 1990–2005: Jon Krabbe
 2005–present: Frederik Lüttichau

References

Firther reading
 Mortensen, Erling: De viste vejen (1979)
 Jørgensen: ;arie-Louise: Det kongelige danske Landhusholdningsselskabs præmiebægre fra selskabets stiftelse 1769 til 1832

External links
 Official website

Agriculture in Denmark
Organizations based in Copenhagen
Organizations established in 1658
1769 establishments in Denmark